Hadriani ad Olympum, or simply Hadriani or Hadrianoi, was a town of ancient Bithynia, not far from the western bank of the river Rhyndacus. It was built, as its name indicates, by the emperor Hadrian, and for this reason did not exist in the time of Ptolemy. As its name indicates, it was situated on a spur of Mount Olympus, and 160 stadia to the southeast of Poemanenus. Hadriani was the birthplace of the rhetorician Aelius Aristides, who was born in 117. In the ecclesiastical writers the town is known as the see of a bishop in the Hellespontine province. No longer a residential see, it remains a titular see of the Roman Catholic Church.

Its site is located near Orhaneli in Asiatic Turkey.

References

Populated places in Bithynia
Former populated places in Turkey
Catholic titular sees in Asia
History of Bursa Province
Hadrian
Populated places established in the 2nd century
Roman towns and cities in Turkey
Orhaneli District